Coral is a feminine given name derived from the  precious coral used to make jewelry. The name is ultimately derived from the Greek word korallion and the Latin coralium. 

The name came into fashion in the Anglosphere in the late 1800s along with other gemstone names for girls. Coral necklaces were traditionally worn by young children to protect them from illness.

Usage
The name was at the height of popularity in most English-speaking countries in the late 1800s and the first half of the 20th century. Its greatest popularity in Spain was between 1980 and 2010. The name has since declined in popularity but remains in regular use. In the United States, 128 newborn girls were named Coral in 2021. Name variants Coralie and Coraline are also in regular use for girls.

Notable people 
Coral Aguirre, pen name of Argentinean-born playwright, musician, and professor of literature Angélica Claro Canteros (born 1938)
Coral Amiga, English actress
Coral Atkins (1936-2016), English actress who opened and ran a home for disadvantaged children
Coral Barbas, Spanish academic who is a professor at the Universidad CEU San Pablo in Madrid, Spain and is known for her research on metabolomics and integration of chemical data
Coral Bell (1923-2012), Australian academic who wrote about international relations and power politics
Coral Bentley (born 1984), retired Australian synchronized swimmer who competed in the 2008 Summer Olympics
Coral Bistuer (born 1966), Spanish taekwondo practitioner
Coral Bracho (born 1951), Mexican poet, translator, and doctor of Literature
Coral Browne (1913-1991), Australian-American stage and screen actress
Coral Buttsworth (1900-1985), Australian tennis player
Coral Casado Ortiz (born 1996), Spanish professional racing cyclist
Coral Drouyn (born 1945), English-Australian actress, singer, and screenwriter/story editor
Coral Egan, Canadian jazz and pop singer
Coral-Jade Haines (born 1996), English women’s footballer
Coral Herrera (born 1977), Spanish feminist writer and communicator based in Costa Rica, known for her critique of the concept of romantic love and her contributions to queer studies
Coral Hull (born 1965), Australian author, poet, artist, and photographer
Coral Lansbury (1929-1991), Australian-born feminist writer and academic
Coral Palmer (born 1942), former New Zealand netball player and coach
Coral Petkovich, Australian writer and translator
Coral Bernadine Pollard (born circa 1940), Barbadian artist
Coral Short (born 1973), queer Canadian multimedia artist and coordinator
Coral Smith (born 1979), American former reality television personality
Coral Taylor (born 1961), Australian female rally co-driver
Coral Wong Pietsch (born 1947), American lawyer who serves as a judge of the United States Court of Appeals for Veteran Claims

Fictional characters
Coral in Finding Nemo
Coral in Faerie Tale Theatre's "The Little Mermaid"
Coral in Saban's Adventures of the Little Mermaid
Coral in The Chronicles of Amber
Coral in Cocktail
Coral in Losing Gemma
Coral in South Sea Sinner
Coral in Dead Ringers
Coral in Sea Wees
Coral in Business with Friends
Coral in The Power and the Glory
Coral in Permissive
Coral in Studio One
Coral in Marvin's Room
Coral in Taxi
Coral in Armchair Theatre
Coral in Marshall Law
Coral in Killer Net
Coral in Strong Medicine
Coral in My Favorite Martians
Coral in The Magic Roundabout
Coral in Water Rats
Coral in Mercy Peak
Coral in Blue Bayou
Coral in The Wedding Video
Coral in Within These Walls
Coral in Assault on Precinct 13
Coral in Jonathan Creek
Coral in La Mariée était en noir
Coral in L'Amour
Coral in Gotita de amor
Coral in El Deseo
Coral in Corazones al límite
Coral Fabre in Profundo carmesí
Coral Mermaid in Amy, la niña de la mochila azul
Coral Machado in Todo por tu amor
Coral Labrada in En carne propia
Coral Torress Olavaria in Ser bonita no basta
Coral Davis in Malpractice
Coral Stacey in Family Affairs
Coral Oates in Class Act
Coral Manning in Ground Control: Dark Conspiracy
Coral O'Connor in Echo Point
Coral Harland in Mountain Justice
Coral Careen in Dr. Heckyl and Mr. Hype
Coral Garrett in Holby City
Coral Bloom in Shortland Street
Coral Richardson in All Saints
Coral Lambert in Prisoner
Coral Whitman in Baywatch
Coral Ward in Sons and Daughters
Coral Grable in Animal Behavior
Coral Kiss in SeaChange
Coral Wilson in The Force
Coral Hoople in Common Law Cabin
Coral Trollarwise in Trollz
Coral Lasonne in Crossroads
Coral Mills in The Hughleys
Coral Mayberry in Lou Grant
Coral Prescott in "Flashpoint", a 1966 episode of the Australian TV series Homicide 
Coral Musker in Orient Express
Coral Galvins in Law & Order
Coral Watson in Ironside
Coral King in Home and Away
Coral Lips in Arabian Nights (2000)
Miss Coral in I Never Promised You A Rose Garden
Coral-Ann in The Troubleshooters

References

English feminine given names
Given names derived from gemstones